Giovanni Lorenzo Forcieri  (born 24 March 1949) is an Italian politician who was elected to the Italian Senate in the 1992, 1994, 1996 and 2001 general election representing left-wing parties.

He is the president of the Distretto Ligure delle Tecnologie Marine
He was also the president of the autorità portuale of La Spezia.

References

External links
Personal page on the site of the Italian Senate

1949 births
Living people
Senators of Legislature XI of Italy
Senators of Legislature XII of Italy
Senators of Legislature XIII of Italy
Senators of Legislature XIV of Italy
Politicians of Liguria